The Bakhshali manuscript is an ancient mathematical text written on birch bark that was found in 1881 in the village of   Bakhshali, Mardan (near Peshawar in present-day Pakistan, historical Gandhara). It is perhaps "the oldest extant manuscript in Indian mathematics." For some portions a carbon-date was proposed of AD 224–383 while for other portions a carbon-date as late as AD 885–993 in a recent study, but the dating has been criticised by specialists on methodological grounds (Plofker et al. 2017 and Houben 2018 §3). The manuscript contains the earliest known Indian use of a zero symbol. It is written in a form of literary Sanskrit influenced by contemporary dialects.

Discovery
The manuscript was unearthed in British India from a field in 1881, by a peasant in the village of Bakhshali, which is near Mardan, in present-day Khyber Pakhtunkhwa, Pakistan. The first research on the manuscript was done by A. F. R. Hoernlé. After his death, it was examined by G. R. Kaye, who edited the work and published it as a book in 1927.

The extant manuscript is incomplete, consisting of seventy leaves of birch bark, whose intended order is not known.
It is kept at the Bodleian Library at the University of Oxford (MS. Sansk. d. 14), though folio are periodically loaned to museums.

Contents

The manuscript is a compendium of rules and illustrative examples. Each example is stated as a problem, the solution is described, and it is verified that the problem has been solved. The sample problems are in verse and the commentary is in prose associated with calculations. The problems involve arithmetic, algebra and geometry, including mensuration. The topics covered include fractions, square roots, arithmetic and geometric progressions, solutions of simple equations, simultaneous linear equations, quadratic equations and indeterminate equations of the second degree.

Composition
The manuscript is written in an earlier form of Sharada script, a script which is known for having been in use mainly from the 8th to the 12th century in the northwestern part of South Asia, such as Kashmir and neighbouring regions. The language of the manuscript, though intended to be Sanskrit, was significantly influenced in its phonetics and morphology by a local dialect or dialects, and some of the resultant linguistic peculiarities of the text are shared with Buddhist Hybrid Sanskrit. The overlying dialects, though sharing affinities with Apabhraṃśa and with Old Kashmiri, have not been identified precisely. It is probable that most of the rules and examples had been originally composed in Sanskrit, while one of the sections was written entirely in a dialect. It is possible that the manuscript might be a compilation of fragments from different works composed in a number of language varieties. Hayashi admits that some of the irregularities are due to errors by scribes or may be orthographical.

A colophon to one of the sections states that it was written by a brahmin identified as "the son of Chajaka", a "king of calculators," for the use of Vasiṣṭha'''s son Hasika. The brahmin might have been the author of the commentary as well as the scribe of the manuscript. Near the colophon appears a broken word rtikāvati, which has been interpreted as the place Mārtikāvata mentioned by Varāhamihira as being in northwestern India (along with Takṣaśilā, Gandhāra etc.), the supposed place where the manuscript might have been written.

Mathematics
The manuscript is a compilation of mathematical rules and examples (in verse), and prose commentaries on these verses. Typically, a rule is given, with one or more examples, where each example is followed by a "statement" (nyāsa / sthāpanā) of the example's numerical information in tabular form, then a computation that works out the example by following the rule step-by-step while quoting it, and finally a verification to confirm that the solution satisfies the problem. This is a style similar to that of Bhāskara I's commentary on the gaṇita (mathematics) chapter of the Āryabhaṭīya, including the emphasis on verification that became obsolete in later works.

The rules are algorithms and techniques for a variety of problems, such as systems of linear equations, quadratic equations, arithmetic progressions and arithmetico-geometric series, computing square roots approximately, dealing with negative numbers (profit and loss), measurement such as of the fineness of gold, etc.

 Mathematical context 
Scholar Takao Hayashi has compared the text of the manuscript with several Sanskrit texts. He mentions that a passage is a verbatim quote from Mahabharata. He discusses similar passages in Ramayana, Vayupurana, Lokaprakasha of Kshemendra etc. Some of the mathematical rules also appear in Aryabhatiya of Aryabhatta,  Aryabhatiyabhashya of Bhaskara I, Patiganita and Trairashika of Sridhara, Ganitasarasamgraha of Mahavira, and Lilavati and Bijaganita of Bhaskara II. An unnamed manuscript, later than Thakkar Pheru, in the Patan Jain library, a compilation of mathematical rules from various sources resembles the Bakhshali manuscript, contains data in an example which are strikingly similar.

Numerals and zero

The Bakhshali manuscript uses numerals with a place-value system, using a dot as a place holder for zero.
The dot symbol came to be called the shunya-bindu (literally, the dot of the empty place). References to the concept are found in Subandhu's Vasavadatta, which has been dated between 385 and 465 by the scholar Maan Singh.

Prior to the 2017 carbon dating a 9th-century inscription of zero on the wall of a temple in Gwalior, Madhya Pradesh, was once thought to be the oldest Indian use of a zero symbol.

Date
In 2017, samples from 3 folios of the corpus were radiocarbon dated to three different centuries and empires, from AD 224–383 (Indo-Scythian), 680–779 (Turk Shahis), and 885–993 (Saffarid dynasty). If the dates are valid, it is not known how folios from different centuries came to collected, and buried.

The publication of the radio carbon dates, initially via non academic media, led Kim Plofker, Agathe Keller, Takao Hayashi, Clemency Montelle and Dominik Wujastyk to publicly object to the library making the dates globally available, usurping academic precedence: 

Referring to the detailed reconsideration of the evidence by Plofker et al., Sanskrit scholar, Jan Houben remarked: 
{{Blockquote
|text="If the finding that samples of the same manuscript would be centuries apart is not based on mistakes ... there are still some factors that have evidently been overlooked by the Bodleian research team: the well-known divergence in exposure to cosmic radiation at different altitudes and the possible variation in background radiation due to the presence of certain minerals in exposed, mountainous rock have nowhere been taken into account."}}

Prior to the proposed radiocarbon dates of the 2017 study, most scholars agreed that the physical manuscript was a copy of a more ancient text, whose date had to be estimated partly on the basis of its content. Hoernlé thought that the manuscript was from the 9th century, but the original was from the 3rd or 4th century. Indian scholars assigned it an earlier date. Datta assigned it to the "early centuries of the Christian era". Channabasappa dated it to AD 200–400, on the grounds that it uses mathematical terminology different from that of Aryabhata. Hayashi noted some similarities between the manuscript and Bhaskara I's work (AD 629), and said that it was "not much later than Bhaskara I".

To settle the date of the Bakhshali manuscript, language use and especially palaeography are other major parameters to be taken into account. In this context Houben observed: "it is difficult to derive a linear chronological difference from the observed linguistic variation," and therefore it is necessary to "take quite seriously the judgement of palaeographists such as Richard Salomon who observed that, what he teleologically called “Proto-Śāradā,” “first emerged around the middle of the seventh century” (Salomon 1998: 40). This excludes the earlier dates attributed to manuscript folios on which a fully developed form of Śāradā appears."

See also
Birch bark manuscript
Bakhshali approximation
Indian mathematics
Zero (number)

Notes

References

Bibliography 

Plofker, Kim; Agathe Keller; Takao Hayashi; Clemency Montelle; and Dominik Wujastyk. "The Bakhshālī Manuscript: A Response to the Bodleian Library’s Radiocarbon Dating" History of Science in South Asia, 5.1: 134-150.

Further reading
 with complete text in Devanagari, 110 pages

External links
The Bakhshali manuscript, MacTutor History of Mathematics archive
Ch. 6 – The Bakhshali manuscript (Ian G. Pearce, Indian Mathematics: Redressing the balance)
Hoernle: On the Bakhshali Manuscript, 1887, archive.org
"A Big Zero: Research uncovers the date of the Bakhshali Manuscript", YouTube video, University of Oxford
Plofker, Kim, Agathe Keller, Takao Hayashi, Clemency Montelle, and Dominik Wujastyk. 2017. “The Bakhshālī Manuscript: A Response to the Bodleian Library’s Radiocarbon Dating”. History of Science in South Asia 5 (1). 134-50. https://doi.org/10.18732/H2XT07.  Challenges the claims made in the YouTube video "A Big Zero."

1881 archaeological discoveries
Bodleian Library collection
History of Pakistan
Indian mathematics
Mathematics manuscripts